Eualcides (d. 498 BCE) was a Greek athlete and military commander from Eretria who was killed by the Persians during the Battle of Ephesus.

He competed in the Olympics. The poet Simonides of Ceos composed an ode in celebration of his successes.

References

Herodotus, The Histories, Book Five, chapter 102. (Project Gutenberg)

Ancient Greeks killed in battle
Ancient Greek generals
5th-century BC Greek people
Ionian Revolt
498 BC deaths
Year of birth unknown